"Dancing Queen" is a Europop and disco song by the Swedish group ABBA, released as the lead single from their fourth studio album, Arrival (1976). It was written by Benny Andersson, Björn Ulvaeus and Stig Anderson. Andersson and Ulvaeus also produced the song. "Dancing Queen" was released as a single in Sweden on 15 August 1976, followed by a UK release and the rest of Europe a few days later. It was a worldwide hit. It became ABBA's only number one hit in the United States, and topped the charts in Australia, Canada, Denmark, the Netherlands, Belgium, Czechoslovakia, Ireland, Mexico, New Zealand, Norway, South Africa, Spain, Sweden, the United Kingdom, West Germany and the Soviet Union. "Dancing Queen" also reached the top five in many other countries.

Musically, "Dancing Queen" is a Europop version of American disco music. As disco music dominated the US charts, the group decided to follow the trend, replicating Phil Spector's Wall of Sound arrangements. Andersson and Ulvaeus have cited George McCrae's "Rock Your Baby" as a source of inspiration for the style of the song. The song alternates between "languid yet seductive verses" and a "dramatic chorus that ascends to heart-tugging high notes". It features keyboard lines by Andersson, which accentuate the melody's sophistication and classical complexity, while Ulvaeus and Andersson interlace many instrumental hooks in and out of the mix. Agnetha Fältskog and Anni-Frid Lyngstad’s layered vocals have been noted for their dynamism, "[negotiating] the melody's many turns flawlessly." Lyrically, the song concerns a visit to the discothèque, but approaches the subject from the joy of dancing itself. Today, the song has become ABBA's most recognisable and popular song.

In 2015, the song was inducted into the Grammy Hall of Fame.

Background and release
The recording sessions for "Dancing Queen" began on 4 August 1975. The demo was called "Boogaloo" and as the sessions progressed, Andersson and Ulvaeus found inspiration in the dance rhythm of George McCrae's "Rock Your Baby", as well as the drumming on Dr. John's 1972 album, Dr. John's Gumbo. The opening melody echoes "Sing My Way Home" by Delaney & Bonnie (from Motel Shot, 1971). Fältskog and Lyngstad recorded the vocals during sessions in September 1975, and the track was completed three months later.

During the sessions, Benny Andersson brought a tape home with the backing track on it and played it to Anni-Frid Lyngstad, who apparently started crying when listening.  Lyngstad said, "I found the song so beautiful. It's one of those songs that goes straight to your heart". Agnetha Fältskog later said: "It's often difficult to know what will be a hit. The exception was 'Dancing Queen.' We all knew it was going to be massive."

While working on the lyrics, the first half of the second verse was scrapped: "Baby, baby, you're out of sight/hey, you're looking all right tonight/when you come to the party/listen to the guys/they've got the look in their eyes..." It survives in footage from a recording session.

The band (especially Andersson) wanted to release "Dancing Queen" as the follow-up single to "Mamma Mia" but their manager, Stig Anderson, insisted that the more sedate and folksy "Fernando" should be first, as he felt it would appeal to a broader audience and so was more likely to be a hit. Therefore, whilst "Dancing Queen" premiered on both German and Japanese television during the spring of 1976, the song did not appear on vinyl until later that summer, having had its first live and domestic performance on 18 June 1976 during an all-star gala staged by Kjerstin Dellert at the Royal Swedish Opera (and shown on Swedish TV) in honour of King Carl XVI Gustaf of Sweden and his bride-to-be, Silvia Sommerlath, who were married the next day. For their 1980 Spanish-language compilation-album Gracias Por La Música, ABBA recorded a Spanish version of "Dancing Queen", renamed "Reina Danzante", with Spanish lyrics provided by Buddy and Mary McCluskey. The track was retitled "La Reina Del Baile" when included on the compilation album ABBA Oro: Grandes Éxitos in the 1990s.

In 1993, in honour of Swedish Queen Silvia's 50th birthday, Anni-Frid Lyngstad was asked to perform "Dancing Queen" on stage, repeating ABBA's 1976 performance of the song at the pre-wedding gala for King Carl XVI Gustaf and Queen Silvia. Frida contacted The Real Group and together they did an a cappella version of the song on stage at the Royal Opera House in Stockholm, in front of the king and queen. The Swedish prime minister at the time, Ingvar Carlsson, was also in the audience that night and said it was an ingenious idea to perform "Dancing Queen" a cappella. The performance was recorded by Sveriges Television (SVT) and is included in the biographical documentary Frida – The DVD and The Real Group's 1994 compilation album Varför får man inte bara vara som man är. When King Carl Gustaf and Queen Silvia attended the Tramp nightclub in London, the King requested that the DJ would play "Dancing Queen" owing to its use shortly before their wedding as previously mentioned.

For the soundtrack of the 1994 Australian film Muriel's Wedding, songwriters Ulvaeus and Andersson allowed the use of "Dancing Queen" and other ABBA hits. "Dancing Queen" was among the ABBA songs included in Mamma Mia!, the jukebox musical first produced in 1999 and adapted in 2008 as movie: Mamma Mia!. It is also featured in the film's sequel, Mamma Mia! Here We Go Again.

The first International Standard Musical Work Code was assigned in 1995 to "Dancing Queen"; the code is T-000.000.001-0.

Critical reception
According to Donald A. Guarisco of AllMusic, the track's "sincerity and sheer musicality have allowed it to outlast the disco boom and become a standard of dance-pop." The song's release also cemented ABBA as an international act and signified the beginning of the group's 'classic period', which would span the following four years. It has become a standard for dance divas like Carol Douglas and Kylie Minogue, and it has been covered numerous times by acts including Ireland's U2. The song has been adopted by the LGBT community and, according to Mojo magazine, remains one of the most ubiquitous "gay anthems".  Billboard found the theme of a person's greatest experience coming at a disco age 17 to be more substantive than most ABBA songs, and compared the vocal harmonies to the Mamas and the Papas.  Cash Box said that the song is "backed by a strong upbeat, in keeping with the title" and "the hooks brought by lush vocal harmonies, as well as the reverb-soaked wall of sound that distinguishes this group, are present." Record World said that "the disco-styled treatment should make it a favorite [in the United States]."

Chart performance
"Dancing Queen" was a worldwide No. 1 hit, topping the charts in more than a dozen countries including ABBA's native Sweden (where it spent 14 weeks at the top), Australia, Belgium, Brazil, Canada, West Germany, the United Kingdom, Ireland, Mexico, the Netherlands, New Zealand, Norway (where it charted for 32 weeks (VG-lista Top 10), making it the 11th best-performing single in that country), South Africa and Rhodesia. "Dancing Queen" also topped the charts in the United States, ABBA's only  1 on the Billboard Hot 100, and was a Top 5 hit in Austria, Finland, France and Switzerland. The song sold over three million copies. The track was the fourth biggest single of 1976 in the UK.

In the UK Singles Chart, "Dancing Queen" was the last of three consecutive chart-toppers for ABBA in 1976, following "Mamma Mia" and "Fernando" earlier in the year. The song was re-released in the UK in 1992, taking advantage of an ABBA revival sparked by the success of Erasure's Abba-esque EP. The re-issued "Dancing Queen" reached No. 16 in the UK in September 1992.

As of September 2021, it is ABBA's biggest song in the UK, being their only million-seller with 1.65 million chart sales, including 93 million streams since 2014.

Legacy
In 2000, "Dancing Queen" came fourth in a Channel 4 television poll of "The 100 Greatest Number One Singles". It was chosen as No. 148 on the Recording Industry Association of America's Songs of the Century list. It was ranked No. 171 on Rolling Stones 2004 list of The 500 Greatest Songs of All Time, the only ABBA song on the list. That same year, it made VH1's 100 Greatest Dance Songs in Rock & Roll at No. 97. Also in 2000, editors of Rolling Stone with MTV compiled a list of the best 100 pop songs; "Dancing Queen" placed 12th among songs of the 1970s. Billboard and Rolling Stone both ranked the song number one on their lists of the greatest ABBA songs.

On 9 November 2002, the results of a poll, "Top 50 Favourite UK #1's", was broadcast on Radio 2, celebrating the 50th anniversary of The Official UK Charts Company. 188,357 listeners voted and "Dancing Queen" came out at No. 8. On 5 December 2010, Britain's ITV broadcast the results of a poll to determine "The Nation's Favourite ABBA Song" in which "Dancing Queen" placed at No. 2.

In 2009, the British performing rights group Phonographic Performance Limited celebrated its 75th anniversary by listing the 75 songs that have played most in Great Britain on the radio, in clubs and on jukeboxes. "Dancing Queen" was number eight on the list.

Former US presidential candidate John McCain named "Dancing Queen" as his favourite song in a top-10 list submitted to Blender magazine in August 2008.

In August 2012, listeners to the 1970s-themed UK radio station "Smooth 70s" voted "Dancing Queen" as their favourite hit of the decade.

In October 2014, the musical instrument insurer Musicguard carried out a survey determining "Dancing Queen" to be the United Kingdom's favourite "floorfiller". Unlike its closest competitors, "Billie Jean"  by Michael Jackson (No. 2) and "Twist and Shout" by The Beatles (No. 3), it turned out to be very popular throughout the nation whereas the other two were strong regional favourites.

In 2015, "Dancing Queen" was inducted into the Recording Academy's Grammy Hall of Fame.

Online music magazine Pitchfork positioned Dancing Queen at number 80 in its 2016 ranking of the 200 best songs of the 1970s. Reviewer Cameron Cook wrote it is "a song so confident in its structure that its starts from the middle of its chorus", adding that it "bottles the out-of-body euphoria that accompanies dancing for dancing’s sake, with no agenda or motive other than pure joy." Eschewing the "disco" label sometimes attached to the track by latter-day critics, Cook called it "a pitch-perfect portrait of the hedonistic disco scene they were mimicking via their own, more down-to-Earth Europop".

In September 2016, The Guardian ran an article by Tim Jonze entitled "Why Abba's Dancing Queen is the best pop song ever". Jonze writes: "Dancing Queen is beautifully produced: catchy and euphoric, the perfect backdrop for a song that encapsulates the carefree bliss of youth". Several artists are cited as being influenced by the song, including Elvis Costello ("Oliver's Army"), MGMT ("Time to Pretend") and Chris Stein of Blondie ("Dreaming").
In 1993, Hong Kong singer Angela Pang covered this song in the Cantonese language.

The British online music industry magazine NME placed "Dancing Queen" at number 27 in its 2018 listing of the top 100 songs of the 70s, reviewer Rebecca Schiller calling it "one of the greatest pop songs ever."

Music video
The song was accompanied by a music video, filmed in 1976 in Alexandra's discotheque in central Stockholm, Sweden. The music video features all four members of ABBA singing and performing to dancing club patrons. Directed by the Swedish film director Lasse Hallström, the music video on YouTube has over 500 million views as of May 2021. The video since has been remastered in ultra-high definition in August 2021 since the 500 million view milestone.

Track listings
 7" Vinyl
 "Dancing Queen" – 3:52
 "That's Me" – 3:15

 1992 7" European re-issue
 "Dancing Queen" – 3:52
 "Lay All Your Love on Me" – 4:35

 1992 12"/CD European re-issue
 "Dancing Queen" – 3:52
 "Lay All Your Love on Me" – 4:35
 "The Day Before You Came" – 5:50
 "Eagle" – 5:49

 1992 12" US re-issue
 "Dancing Queen" – 3:52
 "Take a Chance on Me" – 4:04

Personnel
ABBA
 Agnetha Fältskog – lead vocals and backing vocals
 Anni-Frid Lyngstad – lead vocals and backing vocals
 Björn Ulvaeus – electric guitar
 Benny Andersson – piano and synthesizer

Additional personnel
 Rutger Gunnarsson – bass guitar
 Roger Palm – drums

Charts

Weekly charts

Year-end charts

Sales and certifications

A-Teens version

"Dancing Queen" is a single released by A-Teens, an ABBA tribute band from Sweden. It is the fourth and final single from their first album, The ABBA Generation (1999). Released in March 2000, it serves as the main single for the United States promotion. The song reached 95 on the US Billboard Hot 100 and entered the top 100 in Germany and the Netherlands.

"Dancing Queen" was released as a double A-side with "The Name of the Game" in Europe, where both songs were promoted on radio simultaneously; Universal Music Group thought that "Dancing Queen", being the last single, needed a back-up to be successful. The video for "The Name of the Game" was an unofficial video, made especially for an A-Teens television special in Sweden and it was never intended to be a promotional video. It was only aired by Channel 4 in the UK.

Music video
Directed by Patrick Kiely, the video is set in a large high school. The video is a tribute to the 1980s film The Breakfast Club, where band members (and extras serving as background dancers) are left in a classroom which shifts into a nightclub. Paul Gleason (he died seven years after the video filmed), the US actor who played the assistant principal in the film, reprises the role for the video. It also appears in Night at the Museum: Secret of the Tomb.

Releases
 European 2-track CD single
 "Dancing Queen" (album version) – 3:48
 "The Name of the Game" – 4:17

 European and Mexican CD maxi
 "Dancing Queen" (album version) – 3:48
 "Dancing Queen" (Pierre J's Main Radio Mix) – 3:27
 "Dancing Queen" (Pierre J's Main Extended Mix) – 5:47
 "Dancing Queen" (BTS Gold Edition Mix) – 5:13

 US CD and cassette single
 "Dancing Queen" (album version) – 3:48
 "Dancing Queen" (extended version) – 5:48

Charts

Release history

Other versions

Sandii & the Sunsetz 
In 1978, Japanese synthpop duo Sandii & the Sunsetz did a cover version for their album Mystery Nile.

Maruca e Anastácia version 
Maruca and Anastácia perform the lounge version of the song for the album Lavilla Vol 01 (Edinet S.r.l. Publishing Group, EDNCD036).

Abbacadabra version
In 1992, the British disco group, known for covers of ABBA's songs in a Hi-NRG style charted at number 57 on the UK singles chart countdown after the song was licensed from Almighty Records by Pete Waterman's PWL, due to its popularity on his late-night television program The Hitman and Her. In the US, the song was signed to BMG, where Abbacadabra's version became a club hit after being remixed by Love To Infinity.

Luka Bloom version
In 2000 Luka Bloom released an acoustic version of Dancing Queen on his album Keeper of the Flame.

Glee version
Naya Rivera and Amber Riley of the Glee cast performed the song in "Prom Queen".  It charted on the Billboard Hot 100 at number 74 and in the United Kingdom at number 169.

Mamma Mia! Here We Go Again version
"Dancing Queen" was released on 13 July 2018 alongside the Mamma Mia! Here We Go Again soundtrack, by Capitol and Polydor Records. It was released on 21 July 2018 as the fourth single from the soundtrack. The song is performed by Pierce Brosnan, Christine Baranski, Julie Walters, Colin Firth, Stellan Skarsgård, Dominic Cooper and Amanda Seyfried; it was produced by Benny Andersson.

Charts

References

External links
 

1976 songs
1976 singles
1992 singles
2000 singles
ABBA songs
A-Teens songs
Atlantic Records singles
Billboard Hot 100 number-one singles
Cashbox number-one singles
Dutch Top 40 number-one singles
Epic Records singles
European Hot 100 Singles number-one singles
Irish Singles Chart number-one singles
MCA Records singles
Music videos directed by Lasse Hallström
Number-one singles in Australia
Number-one singles in Germany
Number-one singles in New Zealand
Number-one singles in Norway
Number-one singles in South Africa
Number-one singles in Sweden
Oricon International Singles Chart number-one singles
Polar Music singles
RPM Top Singles number-one singles
Song recordings with Wall of Sound arrangements
Songs about dancing
Songs about teenagers
Songs written by Benny Andersson and Björn Ulvaeus
Songs written by Stig Anderson
Stockholm Records singles
UK Singles Chart number-one singles